"Take Control" is a 1993 song by Swiss artist DJ BoBo, taken from his first album, Dance With Me (1993). It features vocals by singer Christiane Lupp (also known as Christiane Eiben) and was a top 10 hit in Austria and Switzerland. Additionally, it peaked within the top 20 in Finland, Germany and the Netherlands. On the Eurochart Hot 100, the song reached number 21. Outside Europe, it was very successful in Israel, peaking at number two. It sold to gold in Germany.

Critical reception
Larry Flick from Billboard wrote, "Already a household name in various parts of Europe, Swiss producer/musician/rapper stomps into U.S. consciousness with a hi-NRG jam that is often reminiscent of Culture Beat and 2 Unlimited. Although the lyrics never venture beyond the "let's boogie" mode, there is no denying that the contagious chorus and spiraling synths add up to a possible crossover smash. Mixes range from pop-friendly to more hard-edged rave."

Music video
The accompanying music video of "Take Control" was directed by Marten Tedin. It was A-listed on Germany's VIVA in February 1994.

Track listing
 12", Germany
"Take Control" (Club Version) – 5:56
"Take Control" (Radio Mix) – 3:45
"Take Control" (Instrumental) – 5:56

 CD single, Europe
"Take Control" (Radio Mix) – 3:44
"Take Control" (Club Mix) – 5:56

 CD maxi, Switzerland
"Take Control" (Radio Mix) – 3:45
"Take Control" (Club Dance Mix) – 5:56
"Move Your Feet" – 3:55
"Take Control" (Instrumental) – 5:56 

 CD maxi - Remix, Germany
"Take Control" (Club Mix) – 6:16
"Take Control" (Radio Edit) – 4:10
"Music" – 4:34

Charts

Weekly charts

Year-end charts

References

 

1993 singles
1993 songs
DJ BoBo songs
English-language Swiss songs
Songs written by DJ BoBo
ZYX Music singles